N.V. Sheena is an Indian athlete. She won a bronze medal in Triple Jump in the 2017 Asian Athletics Championships.

References

Living people
Year of birth missing (living people)
Indian female triple jumpers